The 1941 Turkish Football Championship was the eighth edition of the competition. It was held in July. Gençlerbirliği won their first national championship title by defeating Beşiktaş in the final. For Gençlerbirliği it was the club's first title with one more to follow in 1946.

The championship was held in a new format again. The champions of the three major regional leagues (Istanbul, Ankara, and İzmir) and 1940 Turkish football champions Eskişehir Demirspor qualified directly for the competition. Kayseri Sümerspor, Gölcük İdman Yurdu, and Trabzon İdman Gücü qualified by winning their respective regional qualification groups. All matches of the championship were played at 19 Mayıs Stadium in Ankara.

Qualified clubs
 1940–41 Istanbul League champions Beşiktaş
 1940–41 Ankara League champions Gençlerbirliği
 1940–41 İzmir League champions Altay
 1940 Turkish Football Championship winners Eskişehir Demirspor
 Adana Group winners Kayseri Sümerspor
 Samsun Group winners Trabzon İdman Gücü
 Balıkesir Group winners Gölcük İdman Yurdu

Round 1

 Beşiktaş received a bye for the semi-finals.

Semi-finals

Final

References

External links
RSSSF

Turkish Football Championship seasons
Turkish
Turkey